Elijah Williams (November 8, 1916 – October 26, 2003), nicknamed "Eddie", was an American Negro league outfielder who played in the 1940s.

A native of Union Springs, Alabama, Williams made his Negro leagues debut in 1943 with the Harrisburg–St. Louis Stars. He went on to play for the Kansas City Monarchs in 1945. Williams died in Miami, Florida in 2003 at age 86.

References

External links
 and Seamheads
 Eli Williams at Negro Leagues Baseball Museum

1916 births
2003 deaths
Kansas City Monarchs players
20th-century African-American sportspeople
Baseball outfielders
21st-century African-American people